Litoleptis is a genus of snipe flies of the family Rhagionidae.

Species
Litoleptis alaskensis Chillcott, 1963 - Alaska
Litoleptis araeostylus Greenwalt, 2019 - Montana
Litoleptis asterellaphile Imada & Kato, 2016 - Japan
Litoleptis chilensis Hennig, 1972 - Chile
Litoleptis himukaensis Imada & Kato, 2016 - Japan
Litoleptis izuensis Imada & Kato, 2016 - Japan
Litoleptis japonica Imada & Kato, 2016 - Japan
Litoleptis kiiensis Imada & Kato, 2016 - Japan
Litoleptis niyodoensis Imada & Kato, 2016 - Japan

References

Rhagionidae
Brachycera genera
Diptera of Asia
Diptera of North America
Diptera of South America